John Douglas Chandler (born September 27, 1965) is an American former professional motorcycle racer. He earned a reputation as one of the most versatile racers of the 1980s and 1990s. Chandler is one of only four riders in AMA racing history to win the AMA Grand Slam, representing national wins at a mile, half-mile, short track, TT and road race. He was inducted into the AMA Motorcycle Hall of Fame in 2006.

Motorcycle racing career

Born in Salinas, California, Chandler began competing in dirt track oval racing after experiencing success in motocross competitions. In 1983 he earned the prestigious AMA Rookie of the Year Award. His first-ever road race win was in 1988 in the Pro-Twins class at Mid-Ohio. He went on to take the AMA Superbike title in 1990 on a Muzzy Kawasaki, also taking World Superbike wins at Brainerd and Sugo that year.

In 1991 Chandler travelled to Europe to compete in the Grand Prix motorcycle racing series. He rode for former world champion Kenny Roberts on a satellite team aboard a Yamaha. He finished a respectable 9th in his first year on the Grand Prix circuit. He accepted a job from Suzuki in 1992 finishing 5th overall, only just behind experienced teammate Kevin Schwantz.  Chandler spent 1993 and 1994 riding for the Cagiva team. He opened 1993 with a podium finish in Australia before things went sour and the team's support moved towards countryman John Kocinski.

After the 1994 Grand Prix season, Chandler left Europe and returned to the AMA Superbike series with Harley-Davidson. After a less than successful year in 1995 developing the Harley-Davidson superbike, he rejoined the Muzzy team for 1996, and won both the 1996 and 1997 AMA Superbike titles. As a result, he joined Fred Merkel and Reg Pridmore as three-time AMA Superbike champions. Despite a severe crash in World Superbike competition at Laguna Seca in 1998, he finished second overall to Ben Bostrom in the AMA Superbike championship. Chandler remained with Kawasaki until 2002, before a final year of road racing with Ducati. In 2003, Chandler tried his hand at Supermoto racing in the inaugural season of the AMA Supermoto Championship. Showing his impressive versatility, Chandler won a race in the new series.

Chandler currently runs motorcycle training courses. In 2015, he began working to assist with race control operations for the American Motorcyclist Association (AMA) sanctioned American motorcycle road racing series, MotoAmerica.

Career statistics

Grand Prix motorcycle racing

By season

Races by year
(key) (Races in bold indicate pole position, races in italics indicate fastest lap)

Superbike World Championship

Races by year

References

External links
 DougChandlerRacing.com - Official racing school site
 The Amazing Career of Doug Chandler, by Dean Adams, Superbike Planet.com
 A photo of Doug racing in the AFM

Living people
AMA Superbike Championship riders
500cc World Championship riders
American motorcycle racers
Superbike World Championship riders
Sportspeople from Salinas, California
Motorcycle trainers
1965 births